Stainton can refer to:

Places in England
 Stainton, Carlisle, Cumbria
 Stainton, Eden, near Penrith, Cumbria
 Stainton, South Lakeland, near Sedgwick, Cumbria
 Stainton, County Durham, near Barnard Castle
 Stainton, Middlesbrough, North Yorkshire
 Stainton, Richmondshire, near Richmond, North Yorkshire
 Stainton, South Yorkshire, in Metropolitan Borough of Doncaster
 Stainton by Langworth, Lincolnshire
 Stainton le Vale, Lincolnshire
 Stainton with Adgarley, Cumbria
 Great Stainton, County Durham
 Little Stainton, County Durham
 Market Stainton, Lincolnshire
 Staintondale, North Yorkshire

People
 Bryan Stainton, English footballer
 Chris Stainton (born 1944), English musician
 Henry Tibbats Stainton, zoologist
 Keith Stainton, politician
 Lisbee Stainton (born 1988), English singer-songwriter
 Sir Ross Stainton (1914-2011), former chief executive of BOAC and British Airways

Ships
, a British coaster in service 1947-51